Chyliny Leśne  is a village in the administrative district of Gmina Szelków, within Maków County, Masovian Voivodeship, in east-central Poland.

The village had a population of 130(as of 2008).

References

Villages in Maków County